Evenko is a Montreal-based event promoter. The company is owned by the Montreal Canadiens' ownership group Groupe CH, which is controlled by the Molson family. It handles event booking for venues such as Bell Centre, the Corona Theatre, and Place Bell.  The company was started in 2002 during George N. Gillett Jr.'s ownership of the Canadiens, and originally known as Gillett Entertainment Group.

In 2013, it acquired L'Equipe Spectra, organizer of Les Francos de Montréal and the Montreal International Jazz Festival. On June 7, 2018, it was announced that a partnership of Evenko and Bell Media had acquired a 51% majority stake in Montreal comedy festival Just for Laughs.

In December 2019, Evenko announced a "strategic partnership" with Live Nation Entertainment.

References

External links

Companies based in Montreal